Maria de Fátima Bezerra (born 19 May 1955) is a Brazilian politician. She has been serving as Governor of Rio Grande do Norte since January 2019. Previously, she was a deputy for Rio Grande do Norte from 1995 to 2015. She is a member of the Workers' Party.

Biography
Daughter of Severino Bezerra de Medeiros and Luzia Mercês do Amaral, Fátima Bezerra was born in Nova Palmeira, Paraíba, but moved to Natal, Rio Grande do Norte, as a teenager. 
In 1980, she graduated in Education from the Federal University of Rio Grande do Norte (UFRN), and soon after, became a public school teacher. 
In addition, she also became an union leader, as Vice-President (1980-1982) and President (1982-1985) of the Association of Educational Advisers General Secretary of the Teachers' Association (1985-1987), General Secretary (1989-1991) and President (1991 -1994) of the Education Workers Union, all union organizations in the state of Rio Grande do Norte.

Political career

State Representative
A member of the Labour Party (PT) since 1981, Fátima Bezerra was elected state deputy for Rio Grande do Norte for two terms: in 1994, with 8,347 votes; and in 1998, with 30,697 votes. 
During the time that she remained in the Legislative Assembly of Rio Grande do Norte (ALRN), she was president of the Human Rights Commission and of the Consumer Protection, Environment and Interior Commission. She also represented the Legislative Power of Rio Grande do Sul in the State Council for the Defense of Human Rights and Citizenship and in the State Council for the Environment. As a parliamentarian, she was delegated to the IV World Conference on Women (Beijing, 1995) and the I and II World Social Forum (Porto Alegre, 2001 and 2002), and participated in the International Meeting in Solidarity with Cuban Women (Havana, 1998) .
In addition, in 1996, 2000, 2004 and 2008, Fátima Bezerra was a candidate for the municipal government of Natal, losing, respectively, to Wilma de Faria (twice), Carlos Eduardo Alves and Micarla de Sousa, until, in the year of 2012, gave up running for the position and launched the candidacy of Fernando Mineiro (PT), who also lost the election in 2012 and 2016.

Federal Deputy
In 2002, Fátima Bezerra ran for the post of federal deputy for Rio Grande do Norte and managed to get elected with the best vote in her state, reaching the sum of 161,875 votes. In 2006, she was re-elected with 116,243 votes and, in 2010, with 220,355 votes, the year in which she obtained the fifth best proportional vote in the country, in addition to achieving the largest vote that a deputy has ever received in Rio Grande do Norte. 
During his first term in the Chamber of Deputies, in August 2003, she voted in favor of the proposal for Pension Reform presented by the Government Luiz Inácio Lula da Silva (2003-2007), approved in two rounds in Congress and sent to the Federal Senate. In December of the same year, the constitutional amendment that changed the country's pension system was promulgated by the then president of the Senate, José Sarney (PMDB). 
In 2004, Fátima Bezerra served as the head of the Special Commission for the Year of Women, in 2005, she was chosen as chair of the Participatory Legislation Commission and, in March 2006, she became the head of the Permanent Commission for Education, Culture and Sport. Still in this last year, she served as the second vice president of the special commission for the PEC that created the Fund for Maintenance and Development of Basic Education and Valorization of Education Professionals (FUNDEB), approved by the National Congress in December. 
Already during her last term in the Federal Chamber, in 2011, Fátima Bezerra held the presidency of the Education Commission, in addition to serving on the Special Commission that discussed Bill 8035/10, referring to the 'National Education Plan' responsible for establishment of guidelines for Brazilian education by 2020.

Senator
In 2014, she ran for the position of senator for Rio Grande do Norte on the plate that supported Robinson Faria of the PSD for governor. Defeating the former governor Wilma de Faria of the PSB, Fátima Bezerra managed to be elected with the sum of 808,055 votes, representing 54.84% of the valid votes. 
In October 2017, Bezerra voted against maintaining the mandate of Senator Aécio Neves, showing himself favorable to the decision of the First Panel of the Supreme Federal Court in the process in which he is accused of corruption and obstruction of justice for requesting two million reais from the entrepreneur Joesley Batista. 
With his election to the state government, his first deputy, Jean-Paul Prates (PT) takes over the mandate.

Governorship
In the 2018 state elections, Fátima Bezerra ran for the government of Rio Grande do Norte through the coalition Do Lado Certo made up of PT, PC do B and PHS, with deputy attorney Antenor Roberto. In the first round, she was in 1st place by reaching 748,150 votes (46.17% of valid votes), defeating then Governor Robinson Faria (3rd) and ahead of former Mayor of Natal, Carlos Eduardo Alves (2nd ), with whom she disputed the second round. In the second round, she was elected governor of the state with the sum of 1,022,910 (57.60% of valid votes), becoming the holder of the largest vote among all the elected governors in the history of Rio Grande do Norte.

References

Living people
1955 births
Members of the Federal Senate (Brazil)
Workers' Party (Brazil) politicians
Members of the Chamber of Deputies (Brazil) from Rio Grande do Norte
Members of the Legislative Assembly of Rio Grande do Norte
Governors of Rio Grande do Norte
Women state governors of Brazil